Lawrence Gilliard Jr. (born September 22, 1971) is an American actor who has appeared in films, television series, and theatre. He portrayed D'Angelo Barksdale on the HBO drama series The Wire, a role which earned him critical acclaim. He is also known for his role as Bob Stookey in the AMC horror drama The Walking Dead. He was in the cast of David Simon's HBO TV series The Deuce, which premiered in September 2017 and concluded in October 2019. Gilliard Jr. has had roles in movies such as Straight Out of Brooklyn (1991), Next Stop Wonderland (1998), and Gangs of New York (2002).

Early life and education 
Gilliard was born in New York City. He and his family moved to Baltimore, Maryland, when he was seven years old.

Gilliard played clarinet and studied classical music at Baltimore School for the Arts. Jada Pinkett Smith and Tupac Shakur were classmates of Gilliard's at the Baltimore School of the Arts.

After attending Juilliard School for three years as a clarinet performance student, Gilliard decided to pursue acting instead of music. He also studied acting at the American Academy of Dramatic Arts, The Acting Studio – New York, and the Stella Adler Conservatory.

Career 
Gilliard made his film debut playing the lead, Dennis Brown, in the 1991 independent film Straight Out of Brooklyn.

Gilliard has appeared on numerous television crime dramas such as Law & Order, Homicide: Life on the Street, The Wire, New York Undercover, and CSI: NY. Film roles include a love-struck ghetto teen in LottoLand (1995), an earnest college football player in The Waterboy (1998), and a member of the Dead Rabbits in Gangs of New York (2002).

Gilliard is also a stage actor. He received positive reviews for his role of Booth in a production of the Pulitzer Prize-winning play Topdog/Underdog. He joined The Walking Dead cast as a regular, playing Bob Stookey.

Personal life 
, Gilliard was married to Michelle Paress, who joined the cast of The Wire in its fifth season.

Filmography

Film

Television

References

External links 

 
 
 

American male film actors
American male stage actors
American male television actors
Juilliard School alumni
Male actors from Baltimore
Male actors from New York City
Living people
1971 births
American Academy of Dramatic Arts alumni
20th-century American male actors
21st-century American male actors
African-American male actors
20th-century African-American people
21st-century African-American people